Frederick Piuze-Roy (born February 26, 1991) is a Canadian ice hockey player. He is currently attending Concordia University where he plays with the Concordia Stingers. Roy played two seasons of professional hockey in the American Hockey League with the Rochester Americans.

Playing career
Roy played major junior hockey with the Quebec Remparts of the Quebec Major Junior Hockey League (QMJHL). Early in the 2008–09 season, Roy received a 15 games suspension from the QMJHL for high sticking Vincent Bourgeois of the Montreal Juniors.

Roy was signed to his first professional contract with the Rochester Americans, affiliate of the Buffalo Sabres, for the 2012–13 season. In 64 games with the Amerks, Roy contributed with 10 points from a checking-line role.

On July 10, 2013, he was re-signed by the Amerks to an additional one-year contract. In the 2013–14 season, Roy matched his career high with 8 goals in 52 games with the Amerks. He competed for the Amerks in the 2013 Spengler Cup. 

After two seasons with Rochester, and with limited interest as a free agent, Roy opted to end his professional career intending to go back to school and further his education.

Personal
His father is the Hall of Fame goaltender Patrick Roy.

Career statistics

Awards and honours

References

External links

1991 births
Living people
Canadian ice hockey centres
Quebec Remparts players
Rochester Americans players
Ice hockey people from Montreal